The Outsiders were an American rock and roll band from Cleveland, Ohio, that was founded and led by guitarist Tom King.  The band released the hit single "Time Won't Let Me" in early 1966, which peaked at No. 5 in the US in April. The band had three other Hot 100 top 40 hit singles in 1966, but none on the Hot 100 afterwards, and released a total of four albums in the mid-1960s.

Allmusic described the act's style: "Part of the secret behind the Outsiders' musical success lay in the group's embellishments [with horns and strings], which slotted in perfectly with their basic three- or four-piece instrumental sound ...  however bold and ambitious they got, one never lost the sense of a hard, solid band sound at the core."

Career

First single 
The Outsiders were a continuation of the Starfires: Tom King, Sonny Geraci, Mert Madsen, Richard Kriss, Al Austin and Howard Blank (who was replaced by Ronnie Harkai before the recording of "Time Won't Let Me"). The name was changed to The Outsiders after the recording of "Time Won't Let Me". A total of five former Starfires were members of the Outsiders at one time or another.

The band was signed to Capitol Records on the strength of their late 1965 recording of "Time Won't Let Me" (written by King and his brother-in-law, Chet Kelley), leaving a local recording label headed by King's uncle, Patrick Connelly (Pama Records). The band's name was changed in early 1966.  Reasons for the name change are unclear, although most sources state that it was at the insistence of their new record label.  One popular story about the new name was that King and Kelley had become "outsiders" within the family as a result of the label shift. "Time Won't Let Me" sold over one million copies and was awarded a gold disc.

The Outsiders had a built-in advantage over the numerous American bands that formed in the wake of the British Invasion. Rather than being neophytes, The Starfires had been a very active rhythm and blues band in the Cleveland scene since 1958, often playing six shows a week. Most of the band's original songs were written by King and Kelley, although another songwriter, Bob Turek was working with the band by 1967. King and Kelley proved to be a formidable songwriting team, and the band was also adept at handling covers of R&B standards. King also headed the band's horn section and served as the arranger and sometime producer.

Touring 
The Outsiders promoted their hit single with about a year of nationwide touring, as "Time Won't Let Me" stayed on the national charts for 15 weeks. Although their music was released in other countries, the band never toured overseas. The band first toured with Paul Revere and the Raiders and then with Chad and Jeremy. The Outsiders were part of a six-week tour of one-night stands headed by Gene Pitney, and which included seven or eight other acts. Afterwards, the Outsiders joined a four-week tour with several garage rock and psychedelic rock bands, as recalled by Geraci: "[W]e did a tour after Pitney with the McCoys, ourselves and ? and the Mysterians, the Shadows of Knight and a group from the west coast called the Seeds...A guy called Pete Shelton from England joined us on bass for this tour. Pete stayed with us until we could find a replacement...he then stayed on for a short while as 'Tour Manager'. There were five rock bands. Was that a crazy tour!"

Later records 
There were several line-up changes over the years, with King (rhythm guitar) and Madsen (bass, harmonica) from the original Starfires along with Geraci (vocals) forming the core of the band in the early years. After Harkai left to join the Air Force, Denny Benson briefly handled drumming duties for the band. Tom King then invited Ricky Biagiola to join the band (a.k.a. Ricky Baker, a stage name given to him because the managers felt Biagiola was too ethnic). With Harkai having departed prior to sessions for the first album, Time Won't Let Me, former Starfire Jimmy Fox (who had left the earlier band to go to college) was brought in by King to be the drummer for the remaining tracks, which included another King/Kelley-written top 40 hit, the ballad "Girl in Love". Following these sessions, Fox decided to return to the music world and founded a band in 1966 called the James Gang that would enjoy considerable success over the coming decade. Ronnie Harkai returned to record cuts on the second album Album Number 2, along with Ricky Biagiola. Ricky Biagiola toured with the band for almost 3 years, and was part of 4 LPs and several singles released, until returning home to Cleveland to continue his education.

A cover of the Isley Brothers' "Respectable" from Album No. 2 reached No. 15 in early September 1966. The Outsiders had performed "Respectable" during their earlier years as the Starfires.

A single by outside songwriters, "Help Me Girl" (from In), had to compete with a version released in the same time period by the Animals. By some accounts, the Animals had already recorded their version, although they assured The Outsiders that they had not. The Outsiders' version peaked at No. 37. They recorded another track by the same songwriters for their third album, but it was not released as a single. The song, "Bend Me, Shape Me", became a major hit on both sides of the Atlantic in early 1968 when it was covered by the American Breed in the US and by Amen Corner in the UK.

After Mert Madsen left the Outsiders to get married, two other ex-Starfires, Walter Nims and Richard D'Amato, plus Richie D'Angelo on drums joined the band. Other session players were brought in to beef up the band's recordings, among them drummer Hal Blaine and bassist Carol Kaye of the Wrecking Crew; also, some recordings were produced by Richard Delvy, who had worked with Sonny and Cher.  Joe Kelley (no relation to Chet Kelley), lead guitarist for the Shadows of Knight, made a guest appearance on the 1967 single "Gotta Leave Us Alone".

Capitol gave tentative approval for a fourth album, which was to have been named after this single, Leave Us Alone.  However, the project was abandoned midway through, in favor of a faux live album called Happening Live! where crowd noises plus song and band member introductions by Sonny Geraci were dubbed onto stripped-down studio renditions of older recordings, along with some recordings by the new line-up. Not long thereafter, the group disbanded.

The Outsiders were one of the early white American soul-influenced bands. The band's "Lonely Man" was bootlegged by a small British label and released in the UK, miscredited to Northern Soul band the Detroit Shakers and retitled "Help Me Find My Way". The sound they first created, combining Mersey Rock & Motown, can be felt in the later hits of the Buckinghams and Chicago.  Jim Guercio, who would manage both of these Chicago groups, had toured with the Outsiders as a musician on the Gene Pitney Caravan.

Post-breakup 
In 1970, Sonny Geraci organized a new band in Los Angeles that included Walter Nims and Nick D'Amico, and released a single as "The Outsiders featuring Sonny Geraci" on the Bell label; commercial copies showed the "O" in OUTSIDERS as a peace symbol. Meanwhile, King was still heading a band called the Outsiders back in Cleveland;  and this band released a single as "The Outsiders (featuring Jon Simonell)"; Simonell being Geraci's replacement as lead singer.  King won a lawsuit in 1970 about the ownership of the name.  Geraci's band name was then changed to Climax and scored a No. 3 hit in 1972 with Nims' "Precious and Few".

Geraci left the music industry in 1980 and spent about five years in sales in his family's home improvement business. In about 1985, he began appearing with several other mid-1960s bands as "oldies" acts and continued to appear in live concerts. Along the way, he released a handful of solo CDs. Despite the earlier lawsuit about the name, Sonny Geraci began touring in 2007 as "Sonny Geraci and the Outsiders".  In April 2012 Geraci suffered a brain aneurysm (specifically, a cerebral arteriovenous malformation), requiring intensive care.

The most recent album by the Outsiders, called 30 Years Live was released in 1996 and reissued in 2006; only two of the original members, King and Nims, were on board. The performances were taken from two live concerts in 1991 in Cleveland, Ohio, and Las Vegas, Nevada.

King died aged 68, on April 23, 2011, in a Wickliffe, Ohio nursing home. He had suffered from multiple health problems and had been at the Wickliffe Country Place nursing home since he fell and injured himself in August. King's death was announced by Kevin King, one of his sons, and confirmed by the nursing home.

Geraci died on February 5, 2017, at the age of 70.

Legacy 

"Time Won't Let Me" is still prominent on oldies radio playlists, but this has created an image of the Outsiders as a "one hit wonder" band.  The song was also included on the box set inspired by the classic garage rock compilation album Nuggets: Original Artyfacts from the First Psychedelic Era, 1965–1968.  Another song, "I'm Not Trying to Hurt You", was included in volume 9 of the Pebbles series. Bill Scheft's novel about a garage rock band being rediscovered by record collectors and then attempting to recapture their glory days as the bandmembers approached the age of 50 was called Time Won't Let Me.

Reissues 
The original Outsiders albums have never been individually reissued as CDs. Rhino Records released Best of the Outsiders in 1985, while Collectables Records has also released a Capitol Collectors Series retrospective album on CD.

Band members

The Starfires/The Outsiders 1965 ("Time Won't Let Me" single) 

 Sonny Geraci, lead vocals
 John Madrid, trumpet
 Al Austin, lead guitar
 Gayle Guhde, keyboards
 Tom King, rhythm guitar, backing vocals, tenor saxophone
 Mert Madsen, bass, harmonica
 Ronnie Harkai, drums

The Outsiders 

 Tom King, rhythm guitar, tenor saxophone, vocals
 Sonny Geraci, lead vocals
 Mert Madsen, bass guitar, harmonica
 Bill Bruno, lead guitar
 Rick Biagiola, drums

The Outsiders (1967 Live album) 

 Tom King, rhythm guitar, tenor saxophone, vocals
 Sonny Geraci, lead vocals
 Richard D'Amato, bass guitar
 Walter Nims, lead guitar
 Ricky Biagiola, drums
 Craig Gephart "lead vocals" for a short period of time after Sonny Geraci Quit

The Outsiders (1991 30 Years Live album) 
 Tom King, guitar, background vocals
 Walter Nims, guitar, background vocals
 Rob Mitchell, vocals, bass guitar
Eddie Soto, vocals
 Ted Sikora, guitar, background vocals
 Dave Hershy, horns
 Joe Potnicky, keyboards
 Dan King, drums
 Rusty Schmidt, vocals
 Nick Farcas, keyboards
 Scott Ingram, bass guitar

Discography

Singles

Reissues and releases outside the U.S. 
"Time Won't Let Me" b/w "Was It Really Real" – Capitol 5573, (Second pressing on the red/orange target label with target logo)
"Time Won't Let Me" b/w "Girl In Love" – Capitol Starline 6165 (Released on the red/white, tan and purple label variations)

Foreign releases 
"Time Won't Let Me" b/w "Was It Really Real" – Capitol #K 23187; rel. 1966 in West Germany, violet label
"Respectable" b/w "Lost In My World" – Jolly #J-20387; rel. in 1966 in Italy

EPs 
"Time Won't Let Me" and "Listen People" b/w "Girl In Love" and "Rockin' Robin" – Capitol #EAP4-2501; rel. 1966 in Mexico, 7"
"Listen People" and "Keep on Running" b/w "Time Won't Let Me" and "Maybe Baby" – Capitol #EAP-4-2501; rel. 1967 in Brazil, 7"
"Gotta Leave Us Alone" and "I Just Can't See You Anymore" b/w "I'll See You In The Summertime" and "And Now You Want My Sympathy" – Capitol #EAP1-20984; rel. 1967 in Mexico, 7"
"Keep on Running" and "My Girl" b/w "Time Won't Let Me" and "Was it Really Real" – American #TK-45, black and yellow label; 7"

Albums

Studio albums 
Time Won't Let Me – Capitol #T-2501/#ST-2501; rel. 5/1966 (#37)
Album No. 2 – Capitol #T-2568/#ST-2568; rel. 9/1966 (#90)
In – Capitol #T-2636/#ST-2636; rel. 1/1967 (Did not chart)
Leave Us Alone – Capitol (No catalogue number, cancelled before release.  However, a tentative album cover slick for this release is shown in the "collage" of The Outsiders' "Capitol Collectors Series" CD booklet)

Live albums 
Happening Live! – Capitol #T-2745/#ST-2745; rel. 8/1967 (#103)
30 Years Live – Collectables; rel. 1996

Reissues and releases outside the U.S. 
Happening Live! – Capitol #POP 672; rel. 1985 in Mexico
Time Won't Let Me and Album No. 2 (plus bonus tracks); two-fer CD reissue – Liberty Bell #PCD 4365 (unofficial disc)
In and Happening Live! (plus bonus tracks); two-fer CD reissue – Liberty Bell #PCD 4366 (unofficial disc)

Retrospective albums 
Capitol Collectors Series – Capitol; rel. 1991
Best of the Outsiders – Rhino #RNLP 70132 / #RNC 70132; rel. 1986
Collectors Series – Collectables; rel. 1996

Compilation albums 

Time Won't Let Me
 Nuggets: Original Artyfacts from the First Psychedelic Era, 1965–1968 (box set)
 Nuggets from Nuggets (CD)
 Nuggets, Volume 3 (LP)
 Pride from Cleveland Past (LP)
"Time Won't Let Me" has also been included on many other compilation albums that are aimed at mainstream audiences; Allmusic lists more than 40 such albums.

I'm Not Trying to Hurt You
 Pebbles, Volume 9 (LP)

Lost in My World
 Nuggets, Volume 4 (LP)

And Now You Want My Sympathy
 Psychedelic Archives – USA Garage, Volume 1 (Cassette)

References

Literature 
The Billboard Book of Top 40 Hits, 7th ed. by Joel Whitburn (2000)

External links

Musical groups established in 1965
Musical groups disestablished in 1968
Garage rock groups from Ohio
Capitol Records artists
Musical groups from Cleveland
Rock music groups from Ohio
Rock and roll music groups